This is a list of candidates of the 1921 South Australian state election.

Retiring MPs

Progressive Country

 Arthur Blackburn (Sturt) – retired

Independent

 John Albert Southwood (East Torrens) – retired

There had also been two resignations in the months leading up to the election which had remained unfilled. Murray Liberal MHA Angas Parsons resigned on 5 January 1921 due to his appointment to the judiciary. Sturt Liberal MHA Edward Vardon resigned on 15 February 1921 in order to nominate, successfully, for a vacancy in the Australian Senate.

House of Assembly
Sitting members are shown in bold text. Successful candidates are marked with an asterisk.

Legislative Council

References

1921 elections in Australia
Candidates for South Australian state elections
1920s in South Australia